Chris John Henry (born June 6, 1985) is a former American football running back. He was drafted by the Tennessee Titans in the second round of the 2007 NFL Draft. He played college football at Arizona.

Henry has also been a member of the Houston Texans and Seattle Seahawks.

College career
Henry played college football at the University of Arizona. In 2003, Henry played only two games after being sidelined by a leg injury. In 2004, he played in 11 games as a redshirt freshman finishing the season with 159 rushing yards on 56 carries, and two touchdowns. In 2005, he finished with 34 carries for 119 yards playing on kicking units and in backup backfield duty in all 11 games. In 2006, he took over as the starter after serving as a backup for Mike Bell and Gilbert Harris. He finished the season with 581 rushing yards on 165 carries and 7 touchdowns. On December 18, 2006, Henry announced that he had decided to forgo his senior year and enter the NFL Draft early.

Professional career

Pre-draft
Henry ran a 4.41 40-yard dash, lifted 26 reps of 225 lbs, and displayed a 36-inch vertical leap at the NFL Scouting Combine.

Tennessee Titans
Henry was selected in the second round (50th overall pick) of the 2007 NFL draft by the Tennessee Titans. On November 3, 2007, Henry received a four-game suspension from the NFL for violating the league's substance abuse policy.  Henry reportedly tested positive for a banned prescription medication that is not performance-enhancing. He finished his rookie season rushing for 119 yards on 31 carries and two touchdowns in seven games.

During his second season Henry played in only one game and got only one carry for three yards.

Henry was released by the Titans on September 29, 2009.

Houston Texans
Henry was signed to the Houston Texans practice squad on October 6, 2009. On December 9 he was added to the active roster. He was waived on September 3, 2010.

Seattle Seahawks
Henry was signed to the Seattle Seahawks practice squad on September 6, 2010. He was re-signed to the Seahawks active roster on October 23, 2010. He was released on August 3, 2011.

References

External links

 Seattle Seahawks bio

1985 births
Living people
Players of American football from Oakland, California
African-American players of American football
American football running backs
Arizona Wildcats football players
Tennessee Titans players
Houston Texans players
Seattle Seahawks players
21st-century African-American sportspeople
20th-century African-American people